This Prize for Artwork is awarded to comics authors at the Angoulême International Comics Festival.
As is the customary practice in Wikipedia for listing awards such as Oscar results, the winner of the award for that year is listed first, the others listed below are the nominees.

2000s
 2002: Le cri du peuple: Les canons du 18 mars by Jacques Tardi and Jean Vautrin, Casterman
 Le Ché by Alberto Brecchia, Enrique Brecchia and Héctor Germán Oesterheld, Fréon
 Les entremondes: Les eaux lourdes by Emmanuel Larcenet and Pascal Larcenet, Dargaud
 Monsieur Mardi Gras Descendres: Le pays des larmes by Éric Liberge, Pointe Noire
 Les olives noires: Pourquoi cette nuit est-elle... by Emmanuel Guibert and Joann Sfar, Dupuis
 Sin City: L'enfer en retour by Frank Miller, Vertige graphic
 Ubu Roi by Alfred Jarry and Daniel Casanave, 400 Coups
 2003: Le dérisoire by Olivier Supiot and Eric Omond, Glénat
 Hellboy: Le ver conquérant by Mike Mignola and John Byrne
 Dr Jekyll et Mr Hyde by Jerry Kramsky and Lorenzo Mattotti
 Manhattan Beach 1957 by Hermann and Yves H.
 Oscar et Monsieur O by Emmanuel Moynot
 Vitesse moderne by Blutch
 2004: Blacksad: Arctic Nation by Juanjo Guarnido and Juan Diaz Canales, Dargaud
 Le commis voyageur by Seth, Casterman
 Les contes du 7ème souffle: Shiro Yuki by Hughes Micol and Eric Adam, Vents d'Ouest
 Le curé: Le jugement by Christian De Metter and Laurent Lacoste, Soleil
 Hulk: Banner by Brian Azzarello and Richard Corben, Panini Comics/Marvel
 Léviathan by Jens Harder, L'An 2
 Ping Pong part 1 by Taiyo Matsumoto, Delcourt
 2005: The Summit of the Gods by Taniguchi, Kana
 Donjon Monstres: Les habitants des profondeurs by Patrice Killoffer, Joann Sfar and Lewis Trondheim, Delcourt
 L’enragé by Baru, Dupuis
 La Malle Sanderson by Götting, Delcourt
 Les mangeurs de vie by Hampton, Les Humanoïdes Associés
 Smart monkey by Winshluss, Cornelius
 Wolverine: Snikt! by Nihei, Panini Comics
 2006: Le vol du corbeau part 2 by Jean-Pierre Gibrat, Dupuis
 Chocottes au sous-sol by Stéphane Blanquet, La joie de lire
 Cinéma Panopticum by Thomas Ott, L’Association
 Gogo Monster by Taiyou Matsumoto, Delcourt
 Mitchum by Blutch, Cornélius
 Prestige de l’uniforme by Hugues Micol and Loo Hui Phang, Dupuis
 Quimby the Mouse by Chris Ware, L’Association

Artwork